Maa Bhoomi is a 1979 Indian Telugu-language social problem film directed by Goutam Ghose in his debut. The film is produced by B. Narsing Rao, who also wrote the film with Goutam Ghose. The film is based on the novel Jab Khet Jage by Krishan Chander on the Telangana Rebellion in Hyderabad State. It depicts a typical life of villagers under feudalistic society in the Telangana region. The film features Sai Chand, Rami Reddy and Telangana Shakuntala in pivotal roles. The plot follows Ramayya, a landless peasant who joins the Telangana Rebellion of 1948.

Released on 23 March 1979, the film was a commercial success and had a theatrical run of over a year.  Maa Bhoomi was India's official entry in the "Opera Primo" section at the Karlovy Vary International Film Festival of June–July 1980, and the Cork Film Festival, October 1980, the Cairo and Sidney Film Festivals 1980. The film was showcased at the Indian Panorama of the 7th International Film Festival of India. Maa Bhoomi won the state Nandi Award for Best Feature Film, and the Filmfare Best Film Award (Telugu). It is featured among CNN-IBN's list of "hundred greatest Indian films of all time".

Plot 
The film follows the story of a young landless Telangana peasant named Ramayya (Sai Chand) from Siripuram, Nalgonda, a region under foreign rule. The British have appointed the Nizam as the region's governor. The Nizam, in turn, has appointed the Reddys and the Patils as the Zamindars (known locally as Doras) of the region who collect taxes among various other things for the Nizam. Further, the Nizam has granted them with titles, Jagirs and judicial rights enabling them to seize thousands of acres of land from the peasants, turning them into tenants.

Ramayya rebels against the corrupt Nizam leadership in Hyderabad. When his wife has to submit to sexual coercion by the officials, he befriends the Communists and participates in the independence struggle. The peasants formed various paramilitary groups and launch guerilla warfare attacks across the region with country-made weapons. They raid and take over regional Dora bases across rural Telangana at night and burn all the land documents found in the bases in the open yard symbolising their triumph. Eventually, they take over the village after the Indian Independence.

The Doras manage to escape to Hyderabad reporting the events to the Nizam leadership. The Nizam commands the Razakars, a private Islamist militia, which perpetrates a massacre of the Telangana peasants. After months of burning, looting, rapes and killings, the Indian army marches into Hyderabad and suppresses the Razakars and the Nizam with Operation Polo in September 1948 and annexes the Telangana region back into the Indian Union. In independent India, the Zamindars (Doras) are returned to power by joining the Congress government. The Doras have abandoned the Nizam and pledged allegiance to the Congress Party.

Cast 
 Sai Chand as Ramayya
Rami Reddy
Telangana Shakuntala
Pradeep Shakthi as Pratapa Reddy
Gaddar
Kakarala

Soundtrack 
"Bandenaka Bandi Katti Padahaaru Bandlu Katti"  written by Bandi Yadagiri
"Palletoori Pillagaada Pasalagaase Monagaada" (with titles) written by Suddala Hanumanthu
"Podala Podala Gatla Naduma, Podicinadhira Chandamama"

Awards 
Nandi Awards
Second Best Feature Film - B. Narsing Rao and G. Ravindranath
Best Screenplay Writer - B. Narsing Rao and Pran Rao

Filmfare Awards South
Filmfare Best Film Award (Telugu) - B. Narsing Rao

References

External links 
 

1979 directorial debut films
1979 films
Films about poverty in India
Films about social issues in India
Films directed by Goutam Ghose
Films set in Hyderabad, India
Films set in Telangana
History of India on film
Indian avant-garde and experimental films
Indian docudrama films
Indian drama films
Indian nonlinear narrative films
Indian war drama films
Indian war films
1970s Telugu-language films
Films based on Indian novels